Deconstruction Tour was a one-day punk music and skate festival that was staged in various countries across Europe. It first took place in 1999 and occurred annually until 2006. The tour was arranged by Destiny Tourbooking. In general, the tour offered the opening slot of each day to a local, often unsigned band, with the following acts increasing in notability throughout the lineup. The festival also included displays by BMX riders and skaters.

Aside from the first year, 2006 was possibly the least successful for the tour, due to problems with booking bands and the limited number of dates that were booked. The tour has not gone ahead since 2006.

Previous lineups

1999
NOFX
Lagwagon
Beatsteaks
H2O
59 Times The Pain
Dogpiss

2000
NOFX
Good Riddance
Mighty Mighty Bosstones (not all dates)
Snapcase
Terrorgruppe
Guttermouth
Mad Caddies
Less Than Jake (Some dates)
Snuff (Some dates)

2001
Pennywise
Sick of it All
Avail
Boysetsfire
Snuff
Catch 22
Bouncing Souls
Beatsteaks
Lagwagon
Capdown
SR-71

2002
Lagwagon
Mighty Mighty Bosstones
Lostprophets
Mad Caddies
H2O
All
The Movielife
Midtown
Randy
The Turbo A.C.'s
Flogging Molly
Fletcher

2003
NOFX
Boysetsfire
Bouncing Souls
Thrice
T.S.O.L.
Terrorgruppe
Real McKenzies
Fabulous Disaster
Strung Out
Flogging Molly
Donots

2004
Pennywise
Lagwagon
Anti-Flag
Beatsteaks
The Slackers
Strike Anywhere
Pulley
MxPx
Yellowcard
1208
The Movement

2005
Mad Caddies
Boysetsfire
Strike Anywhere
Only Crime 
Strung Out (started on May 5th)
From Autumn to Ashes (until May 8th)
Smoke or Fire (until May 8th)
Capdown (until May 7th)

Select dates:
Lagwagon (first two dates only)
Tribute to Nothing (London)
Captain Everything! (London)
NoComply (Manchester)
Uncommonmenfrommars (French dates only)
Banda Bassotti (Trier, Winterthur and Sesto San Giovanni dates only)
Streetlight Manifesto (Trier)
Mad Sin (Winterthur)
Burning Heads (Grenade)

2006
Pennywise
Boysetsfire
Thursday (Cancelled due to "family reasons" before playing)
Bouncing Souls
Mad Sin
Alec Empire

Future
There was no tour in 2007, and although the organisers hoped to bring it back for 2008, it appears that there will be no further Deconstruction Tours.

References

External links
 http://www.deconstruction.de/

NOTE: Although this reference directs to a forum, the posts are answered by "Dave" - this is the owner/booker of Destiny.

Music festivals in Europe
Rock festivals in the United Kingdom
Punk rock festivals
Music festivals established in 1999